Lemmie Earl Miller (born June 2, 1960) is a former professional baseball outfielder.  He appeared in eight games for the Los Angeles Dodgers of Major League Baseball (MLB) during the 1984 baseball season.  Miller later moved to the Rockford, Illinois area, married and was assistant coach of the Kishwaukee College men's baseball team.

References

External links

1960 births
Living people
African-American baseball players
Albuquerque Dukes players
American expatriate baseball players in Mexico
Baseball players from Dallas
Charlotte O's players
Los Angeles Dodgers players
Major League Baseball outfielders
Minor league baseball managers
Rochester Red Wings players
San Antonio Dodgers players
San Antonio Missions players
San Jose Bees players
Santa Barbara City Vaqueros baseball players
Saraperos de Saltillo players
Vero Beach Dodgers players
21st-century African-American people
20th-century African-American sportspeople